The 2012–13 FC Ingolstadt 04 season was the 8th season in the club's football history. In 2012–13 the club played in the 2. Bundesliga, the second tier of German football. It was the club's third consecutive season in this league since 2010–11, having won promotion from the 3. Liga in 2010.

The club also took part in the 2012–13 edition of the DFB-Pokal, the German Cup, but was knocked out by fellow second division side VfR Aalen in the first round.

Competitions

Friendly matches

2. Bundesliga

League table

Matches

DFB-Pokal

Sources

External links
 2012–13 FC Ingolstadt 04 season at Weltfussball.de 
 2012–13 FC Ingolstadt 04 season at kicker.de 
 2012–13 FC Ingolstadt 04 season at Fussballdaten.de 

Ingolstadt
FC Ingolstadt 04 seasons